The Purús red howler (Alouatta puruensis) is a species of howler monkey native to Brazil, Peru and north of Bolivia.

Subspecies

The subspecies include:
A. p. amazonica
A. p. arctoidea
A. p. insulanus
A. p. juara
A. p. macconnelli
A. p. puruensis
A. p. sara
A. p. seniculus
A. p. stramineus

References

Purús red howler
Mammals of Brazil
Mammals of Bolivia
Mammals of Peru
Purús red howler
Taxa named by Einar Lönnberg